People's Socialist Revolutionary Party (HASI) was a non-legal Basque political party, considered commonly to be the political branch of ETA. It always ran as part of the coalition of the Basque National Liberation Movement, Herri Batasuna, until its self-dissolution in the 1990s. The party's acronym "HASI" means "to begin" in Basque language.

References

Casanova, Iker; Asensio, Paul (2006). Argala. Tafalla (Navarra): Editorial Txalaparta. p. 376. .

Defunct communist parties in the Basque Country (autonomous community)
Basque nationalism
1979 establishments in Spain
Political parties established in 1979
Communist parties in Spain
Banned political parties in the Basque Country (autonomous community)